[[File:Fjäre härad.jpg|thumb|Location of Fjäre hundred'' in Halland]]Fjäre Hundred''' was a hundred in Halland, Sweden.

It was composed of Fjärås, Frillesås, Förlanda, Gällinge, Hanhals, Idala, Landa, Onsala, Släp, Tölö, Vallda, Älvsåker and Ölmevalla parishes in Kungsbacka Municipality as well as Lindome parish in Mölndal Municipality

References

Hundreds of Halland